Infundibulicybe mediterranea is a species of agaric fungus in the family Tricholomataceae. Found in Mediterranean Europe, it was described as new to science in 2011. It is closely related to Infundibulicybe gibba, but can be distinguished from that species by its darker colored fruitbody and smaller spores, which measure 4.5–6 to 3–4 µm. The fungus is edible. It fruits singly in groups, or occasionally in rings under oaks, such as Quercus suber and Quercus ilex.

References

External links

Edible fungi
Fungi described in 2011
Fungi found in fairy rings
Fungi of Europe